is a Japanese footballer currently playing as a winger for Avispa Fukuoka.

Career statistics

Club

Notes

Honours

Club
FC Tokyo
J.League Cup: 2020

References

External links

1997 births
Living people
Japanese footballers
Association football midfielders
J1 League players
J3 League players
FC Tokyo players
FC Tokyo U-23 players